Rana marsupial may refer to:
 Gastrotheca monticola
 Gastrotheca longipes

Animal common name disambiguation pages